The Salève, or Mont Salève, is a mountain of the French Prealps located in the department of Haute-Savoie in Auvergne-Rhône-Alpes. It is also called the "Balcony of Geneva" (French: Balcon de Genève).

Geography 
Geographically, the Salève is a mountain of the French Prealps located in the Haute-Savoie department, but geologically a part of the Jura chain, as the Vuache is. Below the Salève is the Geneva urban area where more than 700,000 people live.

The Salève consists of the Pitons, Grand Salève and Petit Salève; it culminates at 1,379 metres at the Grand Piton. It is accessible via the Téléphérique du Salève, a cable car, since 1932 (rebuilt in 1983). The Salève stretches between Étrembières in the north and the suspension bridge of La Caille in the south. Between 1892 and 1935, the Salève was served by the first electric rack railway in the world (Chemin de fer du Salève).

The eastern side of the Salève dives under the molasse of the Bornes Massif while the abrupt mountain slope facing Geneva is subject to erosion. The vegetation – or the absence thereof – enhances the limestone's layers. This side of the mountain is slit by several narrow and deep gorges, among which the Grande Varappe, which at the end of the 19th century gave its name to the activity of rock climbing in French. This discipline developed intensely there, at a time when it was only beginning.

The Monnetier Valley, separating the Petit and Grand Salève, is due to glaciary erosion. Modern geologists now think that this valley was dug by the subglaciary currents in a fissured region between the Petit and Grand Salève and not by the Arve as was assumed earlier.

From prehistory to green tourism 
Between 12,000 and 10,000 BC, the Salève hosted a magdalenian site. From 1833, Genevan physician François Isaac Mayor, then Minister Taillefer, as well as dentist Thoily explored the mountain's past. The cliff near Veyrier turned out to be a prehistoric shelter. Bones (partridge, reindeer, horse, marmot amongst others), flint and engraved wood were found in dozens of places including caves, shelters and settlements. There was a dolmen at Aiguebelle.

Between the Neolithic and the Bronze Age, the settlements became more sedentary (Bossey, Chaffardon). An oppidum was erected on the Petit Salève around 1000 BC.

The Salève offers a magnificent panorama over the Geneva agglomeration, Lake Geneva, the south of the Jura mountains, the Prealps, Lake Annecy and Mont Blanc. It is used for leisure time activities by the inhabitants of Geneva due to its proximity to the city (for this reason it is often called the "mountain of the Genevans"). One can practice rock climbing, hiking, mountain biking, paragliding, hang gliding, model aircraft, speleology as well as skiing at the Col de la Croisette. It can be accessed from the centre of Geneva by public bus (No. 8, 34, 41) to Veyrier-Ecole or Veyrier-Douane. Whilst the Salève is open free of charge, it also hosts agriculture – the cows of the Salève supply Geneva with milk – and forestry.

"Syndicat mixte du Salève" and "Maison du Salève" 
The "Syndicat mixte du Salève" was created in 1994 and regroups the twenty communes on whose ground the Salève is located. Its objective is to appreciate and protect the mountain which is a "preserved island" in the middle of a French-Suisse territory that is highly urbanized with more than 700.000 inhabitants.

 
The syndicat opened the "Maison du Salève" in September 2007 in an ancient Mikerne farm house dating from 1733. This documentation center presents all aspects of the mountain: its history, patrimony, nature, sports and leisure. In the same year, it developed a charter for sustainable development of the Salève trying to reconcile the conservation of the massif with its increasing frequentation with a vision on 30 years. The "Maison du Salève" hosts a permanent exposition, temporary exhibitions as well as guided tours, excursions and conferences about the local patrimony and the environment.

The syndicat involves in its three work groups - agriculture, tourism and leisure, access and transportation - all users of the Salève, meaning communes, sport clubs, environment protection associations, restorations, farmers, hunters, as well as tourism offices amongst others.

Tibetan temple 
Shedrub Choekhor Ling is a centre of Tibetan Buddhism on the Salève. It is under the direction of the Sangha sur Salève association. The monastery opened its doors to public in September 2010. It has deck open for public from where the Jura mountains can be seen as the backdrop of Geneva. It is beautiful to see the monks performing daily rituals and prayers inside the monastery and one could buy Buddhist and Tibetan handicrafts, decorative items, books and jewellery from the store in the monastery.

The Salève in literature 
 In Frankenstein by Mary Shelley, the creature after having fled climbs up the Salève (Chapter 7).
 

 The Dedicace to the Last song of Harold's Pilgrimage, proposed by Lamartine in 1825 as the conclusion of his friend Lord Byron's uncompleted poem, is located on the Salève. Byron died in 1824. (See the French page for the complete "Dedicace").

The Salève in paintings 

The Salève occurs on one of the first European paintings depicting a realistic landscape, La Pêche Miraculeuse by Konrad Witz created in 1444.

Gallery

References

External links

Cable car
Hike club starting 10am on Sundays mornings from Veyrier-Douane
Saleve Airlines, school of paragliding
Shedrub Choekhor Ling site
Salève, in the Historical Dictionary of Switzerland

Mountains of Haute-Savoie